Ardnurcher is a civil parish in County Offaly, Ireland.

Ardnurcher is one of four civil parishes in the barony of Kilcoursey in the Province of Leinster. It is contiguous with the majority of the Ardnurcher civil parish, which is in County Westmeath.

Ardnurcher civil parish, County Offaly comprises 14 townlands: Ardnurcher Glebe, Attiblaney, Ballykilleen, Ballynakill Beg, Ballynakill Little, Burrow, Cappydonnell Big, Cappydonnell Little, Cloncraff, Dunard, Kilmalady Big, Kilmalady Little, Russagh and Tully.

The neighbouring civil parishes are: Ardnurcher, or Horseleap  (County Westmeath) to the north and east, Kilbride to the south, Kilmanaghan to the south and west and Kilcumreragh to the west and north.

References

External links
Ardnurcher civil parish at the IreAtlas Townland Data Base
Ardnurcher civil parish at townlands.ie
Ardnurcher civil parish at The Placenames Database of Ireland

Civil parishes of County Offaly